The Elk River Chain of Lakes Watershed is a  waterway consisting of 14 lakes and connecting rivers in the northwestern section of the Lower Peninsula of the U.S. state of Michigan, which empty into Lake Michigan.

The watershed includes  in Antrim, Charlevoix, Grand Traverse, and Kalkaska counties. The watershed includes a series of 14 lakes and interconnecting rivers. From the uppermost lake in the chain, Beals Lake in Echo Township, Antrim County, the water flows  and drops  in elevation.

Geography 
From here, the waterway traverses a number of small lakes flowing north, then making a sharp turn near the village of Ellsworth, flows south through a narrow valley, paralleling the tracks of the Pere Marquette Railroad, until emptying into Intermediate Lake. The outlet of Intermediate Lake converges with the Cedar River in the village of Bellaire, gaining considerable volume. Now a river of substantial flow, it continues south into  Lake Bellaire. Leaving the lake, the stream becomes the Grass River, winding for some  through the scenic Grass River Natural Area before emptying into Clam Lake. Clam Lake in turn empties directly into Torch Lake. The waterway, now clarified after traversing the immense depths of the lake, continues south through the Torch River, joins with the Rapid River, a major tributary, and empties into Lake Skegemog, a  lake that is studded with large stump fields, the result of the flooding of timberlands when the lake level was raised several feet by the construction of the dam at the terminus of the system. Lake Skegemog, which is the meeting point of Grand Traverse, Kalkaska and Antrim counties, is conjoined at its western end to  Elk Lake, the second-largest and final lake in the system. For most of its length, the chain is navigable by small boat, broken up only by a dam in Bellaire. Larger boats are able to navigate between Elk Rapids and Torch Lake.

History 

Various tribes of primarily Ojibwa Native Americans inhabited the region when the first white settlers began to arrive in the middle of the 19th century to attempt farming.  The thin soils and short, cool summers made traditional farming difficult, and the region remained sparsely settled until the 1880s, when lumber interests began exploiting the region's vast tracts of white pine forests.  The waterway provided an excellent means of transporting logs down to sawmills located along the way.  The arrival of the railroads in the 1890s accelerated lumbering and other economic activities, and brought in visitors from distant places, who marveled at the natural beauty of lakes and rivers of the chain, turning it into a major destination for vacationers from downstate and elsewhere.  Scores of resorts cropped up on the shorelines of all the major lakes of the system, catering to fisherman and wild-life enthusiasts.  By 1910, the lumber era had all but passed, and many once prosperous towns and villages in the area went into decline.  Many of the region's farmers, having failed to get decent yields of traditional crops, either moved on, or turned to cultivation of fruit crops, most notably cherries, as the area's sandy soil and cool lake climate were found to be favorable for growing such produce.  Fruit farming and tourism became, and remain, the leading economic activities of the region.

Rivers and lakes in the watershed 
The 14 lakes (numbered) and connecting waterways in the chain of lakes are highlighted in bold. Other tributaries are in normal text
 Elk River
 1) Elk Lake
 Williamsburg Creek
 Bissell Pond
 Bissell Creek
 Battle Creek
 2) Lake Skegemog
 Barker Creek
 Desmond Creek
 Torch River
 Rapid River
 Rugg Pond (also known as Antrim Pond)
 Little Rapid River
 3) Torch Lake
 Spencer Creek
 Eastport Creek
 Wilkinson Creek (also Wilkenson Creek)
 4) Clam Lake
 Finch Creek
 Crow Creek
 Grass River
 Cold Creek
 Shanty Creek
 5) Lake Bellaire
 Grass Creek
 Intermediate River
 Cedar River
 Blair Lake
 North Branch Cedar River
 Woolcott Creek
 6) Intermediate Lake
 Openo Creek
 Fisk Creek
 7) Hanley Lake
 Green River
 Ogletree Creek
 Kitty Ann Creek
 Toad Lake
 Toad Creek
 Mud Lake
 Little Torch Lake
 8) Ben-way Lake
 Benway Creek
 9) Wilson Lake
 Vonstraten Creek
 King Creek
 Eaton Lake
 10) Ellsworth Lake
 Skinner Creek
 Skinner Lake
 Marion Creek
 11) St. Clair Lake
 St. Clair Creek
 Lyman Creek
 Lymans Lake (also Lyman Lake)
 12) Sixmile Lake
 Liscon Creek
 Ranney Creek
 Vance Creek
 Dingman River
 Smith Creek
 13) Scotts Lake
 Beal Creek
 14) Beals Lake
 Intermediate River
 Spence Creek
 Taylor Creek
 Seamon Creek
 Hitchcock Creek

Cities, villages, and townships in the watershed 
The Elk River Chain of Lakes Watershed includes all or portions of the following cities, villages, and townships:

 Antrim County
 Banks Township
 Bellaire
 Central Lake
 Central Lake Township
 Chestonia Township
 Custer Township
 Echo Township
 Ellsworth
 Elk Rapids
 Forest Home Township
 Helena Township
 Kearney Township
 Mancelona Township
 Milton Township
 Star Township
 Torch Lake Township
 Warner Township

 Charlevoix County
 Marion Township
 Norwood Township
 South Arm Township
 Grand Traverse County
 Whitewater Township
 Kalkaska County
 Clearwater Township
 Cold Springs Township
 Kalkaska
 Kalkaska Township
 Rapid River Township
 Otsego County
 Elmira Township

See also 

 Inland Waterway (Michigan)
 List of lakes in Michigan

References

External links 
 Elk River Watershed, Tip of the Mitt Watershed Council
 Elk River Chain of Lakes Watershed, Michigan Department of Environmental Quality

Lakes of Michigan
Chains of lakes
Water trails
Lakes of Antrim County, Michigan
Lakes of Charlevoix County, Michigan
Lakes of Grand Traverse County, Michigan
Lakes of Kalkaska County, Michigan
Tributaries of Lake Michigan